Joculator christiaensi is a species of minute sea snails, marine gastropod molluscs in the family Cerithiopsidae. 

It was first described by Jay and Drivas in 2002.

Distribution
This marine species occurs off Southern Madagascar and off Réunion.

References

External links
  Jay M. & Drivas J. (2002). The Cerithiopsidae (Gastropoda) of Reunion Island (Indian Ocean). Novapex. 3(1): 1-45

Gastropods described in 2002
christiaensi